Vida Brest (true name Majda Peterlin) (21 July 1925 – 10 November 1985) was a Yugoslav Slovene-language poet, writer, journalist, and teacher, best known for her juvenile fiction, often based on her own experiences as a young Partisan during the Second World War.

Brest was born in Šentrupert in Lower Carniola in 1925. At the age of 17 she joined the resistance movement and after the end of the Second World War became a journalist and teacher. She later devoted herself to writing, her main inspiration being her own experiences during the war, but also wrote fairy tales and children's stories. From a very early age she also wrote poetry, with her first poems being published by the Partisan press during the war. A selection of her best poems was published posthumously in 1995, selected and edited by Ivan Minatti.

She won the Levstik Award in 1984 for her book of stories from the resistance entitled Majhen človek na veliki poti (A Small Man on a Big Road).

Published works

Poetry
 16 pesmi Vide Brest (16 Poems of Vida Brest), 1944
 Pesmi (Poems), 1947
 Mihčeve pesmi (Little Miha's Poems), 1951
 Teci, teci, soncu reci (Run, Run, Tell the Sun), 1986
 Tiho, tiho srce (Silent, Silent Heart), (selected and edited by Ivan Minatti), 1995

Prose
 Pravljica o mali Marjetici, zajčku, medvedu in zlati pomladi (The Story of Little Margaret, the Bunny, the Teddy, and the Golden Spring), 1951,1958
 Ptice in grm (The Birds and the Bush), 1955, 1961
 Orehovo leto (The Year of the Walnut), 1955, 1972
 Popotovanje v Tunizijo (A Trip to Tunisia), 1967
 Veliki čarovnik Ujtata (The Great Wizard Ujtata), 1974
 Prodajamo za gumbe (We Sell Buttons), 1976
 Majhen človek na veliki poti (A Small Man on a Big Road), 1983
 Mala Marjetica in gozdni mož (Little Margaret and the Forest Man), 1985
 Teci, teci, soncu reci (Run, Run, Tell the Sun), (selected and edited by Niko Grafenauer), 1986

References

1925 births
1985 deaths
Yugoslav writers
Slovenian poets
Slovenian children's writers
Yugoslav Partisans members
Levstik Award laureates
Ethnic Slovene people
Yugoslav women writers
Slovenian women children's writers
Slovenian women poets
20th-century women writers
20th-century Slovenian writers
20th-century poets
Communist women writers
People from the Municipality of Šentrupert
Women in the Yugoslav Partisans